The Big Slough Wilderness is a  protected area in Davy Crockett National Forest in Houston County, Texas, United States. The area was added to the National Wilderness Preservation System in 1984 with the passage of the Texas Wilderness Act. It is the smallest wilderness in Texas. Logging occurred in the area during the 1800s, and the regrown forest consists of 66 percent hardwoods, 26 percent shortleaf and loblolly pines, four percent a mixture of hardwoods and pines, and four percent water.

References

Protected areas established in 1984
Wilderness areas of Texas
1984 establishments in Texas